The 1980 Mid-American Conference men's basketball tournament was held February 26–28 at a combination of on-campus gymnasiums and the Crisler Center in Ann Arbor, Michigan. This was the first edition of the tournament.

Top-seeded Toledo defeated Bowling Green in the inaugural championship game, 85–70, to win their first MAC men's basketball tournament.

The Rockets, in turn, received a bid to the 1980 NCAA tournament. They were the only MAC program invited to the tournament.

Format
First Round games were played at the home court of the higher-seeded team. All remaining games (semifinals, third-place final, and championship) were played at the Crisler Center in Ann Arbor, Michigan.

Bracket

References

Mid-American Conference men's basketball tournament
Tournament
MAC men's basketball tournament
MAC men's basketball tournament
Sports in Ann Arbor, Michigan